Cobalt-precorrin-7 (C15)-methyltransferase (decarboxylating) (CbiT) is an enzyme with systematic name S-adenosyl-L-methionine:precorrin-7 C15-methyltransferase (C12-decarboxylating). This enzyme catalyses the following chemical reaction

 cobalt-precorrin-7 + S-adenosyl-L-methionine  cobalt-precorrin-8x + S-adenosyl-L-homocysteine + CO2

This enzyme catalyses both methylation at C-15 and decarboxylation of the C-12 acetate side chain of cobalt-precorrin-7 in the anaerobic pathway of adenosylcobalamin biosynthesis in bacteria such as Salmonella typhimurium, Bacillus megaterium, and Propionibacterium freudenreichii subsp. shermanii.

See also
 Cobalamin biosynthesis

References

External links 

EC 2.1.1